George Hazle (3 October 1924 – 12 November 2011) was a South African racewalker. He competed in the 20km and 50km walking events at the 1960 Summer Olympics.

References

1924 births
2011 deaths
Athletes (track and field) at the 1960 Summer Olympics
South African male racewalkers
Olympic athletes of South Africa
Sportspeople from Cape Town